Marion Maruska (born 15 December 1972) is an Austrian former tennis player. She turned professional in 1992 and reached her career-high singles ranking on October 6, 1997, when she became the No. 50 of the world.

1997 was Maruska's best year on the WTA Tour, highlighted by her first (and only) WTA title and another tour final amid a wave of inconsistent results. As the world No. 154, she won her debut WTA title at the ASB Classic held in Auckland, New Zealand. En route, she beat Anke Huber for her first top-ten win. At Wimbledon, she won her first ever Grand Slam main-draw match when she beat Adriana Gersi, before falling to recently crowned French Open champion Iva Majoli. At the ECM Prague Open, she made her second tour final, but this time failed to walk away with the title.

1998 was a poor year for Maruska in comparison. She reached the second round of the French Open but had few other results and fell out of the top 100, subsequently never reaching her level of one year ago again.

She played much of her career on the ITF circuit, where she won four singles titles and three doubles titles.

Maruska represented Austria in Fed Cup five times: 1997, 1997, and 2000–2002. She earned a 2–6 record in those ties.

In 2001, she played her last professional singles match, at the US Open, losing to Nathalie Vierin in the first round of qualifying. Her final career match, however, was a Fed Cup doubles loss to the American team of Lisa Raymond and Monica Seles.

WTA career finals

Singles (1–1)

Doubles (0–1)

ITF finals

Singles (4–4)

Doubles (3–2)

External links
 
 
 

1972 births
Living people
Austrian female tennis players
People from Mödling
Sportspeople from Lower Austria